Sonajharia Minz is an Indian academician and an adivasi activist. She is the second tribeswoman hailing from Chotanagpur and appointed as a Vice-Chancellor in Sido Kanhu Murmu University, Dumka.

Early life
Minz hails from Oraon tribe of Gumla district in Jharkhand. She is the daughter of Nirmal Minz, a social ideologue and activist. She completed her schooling in Ranchi and graduated from Women's Christian College, Chennai. She passed M.Sc in Mathematics from Madras Christian College, Chennai.

Academic career
She completed her M.Phil, Ph.D in Computer Science from Jawaharlal Nehru University (JNU). Minz worked as the assistant professor in the Department of Computer Science, Madurai Kamaraj University in 1991, as well as Barkatullah University of Bhopal since 1990. She published several research papers in national and international journals. 

In 1992, Minz joined in the post of assistant professor of Computer Science in Jawaharlal Nehru University. 

Later, she was also appointed in the post of Associate Professor in 1997 and was promoted to be professor since 2005 at the School of Computer & Systems Sciences, Jawaharlal Nehru University. She worked for the rights of underprivileged and group of Dalit students. She also became the President of JNU’s Teacher Association (JNUTA). 

On 27 May 2020, the Governor of Jharkhand, Draupadi Murmu appointed her as the vice-chancellor to the Sido Kanhu Murmu University in Dumka.

References

Living people
Adivasi activists
Indian women activists
21st-century Indian educators
Adivasi women
People from Adi Community
People from Gumla district
Indian women scholars
Indian women academics
21st-century women educators
Year of birth missing (living people)